London Melody is a 1937 British musical film directed by Herbert Wilcox and starring Anna Neagle, Tullio Carminati and Robert Douglas. It was made at British and Dominions Imperial Studios, Elstree and Pinewood Studios  by Wilcox's independent production company and distributed by J. Arthur Rank's General Film Distributors. It was also released with the alternative title Look Out for Love.

It was the first movie shot at Pinewood.

Synopsis and production
A musical with a trial. One of several Anna Neagle - Tullio Carminati vehicles of the era, London Melody was one of five films directed within a year or so by Neagle's future husband, Herbert Wilcox. This time around, Carminatti is cast as Marius Andreani, a cultured Italian diplomat. While in London on business, Marius makes the chance acquaintance of boisterous cockney street entertainer Jacqueline (Neagle). It is love at first sight, but hero and heroine must undergo a dizzying series of roadblocks and misunderstandings before the climactic clinch. Meanwhile, Jacqueline rises to the top of show-business success, never dreaming (until the end, at least) that it is all the secret handiwork of faithful Marius.

British and Dominions Imperial Studios was destroyed by fire in the early morning of 9 February 1936, necessitating the move of the production to Pinewood.

Cast

Critical reception
In 1937, The Sydney Morning Herald called it an "attractive and well-acted picture...Produced and directed by Herbert Wilcox in a way that contrasts favourably with Hollywood's efforts in a similar direction...Anna Neagle, a gifted actress, with definite charm and personality, makes a delightful Jacqueline. As the diplomat...Tulllo Carminati lends distinction and poise to his role. Perhaps the best character in the film is the priest, Horace Hodges, a lovable and very human person. Robert Douglas makes a good impression in the rather inconsistent part of Nigel Taplow, Andreani's secretary"; whereas more recently, Sky Movies described it as "a very thin musical vehicle for Anna Neagle, bizarrely cast as a cockney street singer. This dated offering...will prove tough going for all but hardened Neagle fans today."

References

Bibliography
 Low, Rachael. Filmmaking in 1930s Britain. George Allen & Unwin, 1985.
 Wood, Linda. British Films, 1927–1939. British Film Institute, 1986.

External links
 
 
 

1937 films
1937 musical films
British black-and-white films
British musical films
1930s English-language films
Films directed by Herbert Wilcox
Films shot at British International Pictures Studios
Films shot at Pinewood Studios
Films set in London
1930s British films